Baga Creek is a tidal estuary in the state of Goa, India located near the town of Baga at .

Estuaries of India